Brīvības iela is the central street of Riga, the capital of Latvia. It is more than 12 km long, going through all of Riga from the historical centre to the outskirts.

History

The street was the beginning of an important trade route - the road to the region of Vidzeme (Southern Swedish Livonia) and the Russian city of Pskov. It began with what is today Smilšu iela and went through Riga's suburbs. The city entrance next to the Powder Tower was initially the main entrance to Riga from the countryside. As the city expanded, the city gates moved more towards the east and the street was extended further.

In the late 19th century and early 20th various Art Nouveau buildings were erected on what now is Brīvības iela.

Throughout its history, the street and its three main parts were known as Große Sandstraße (before 1818), Aleksandrovskaya ulitsa (Александровская улица)/Alexanderstraße (1818-1923), Brīvības gatve (1923-1942, 1944-1950), Adolf-Hitler-Straße (1942-1944) and Ļeņina iela (1950-1991).

Today, Brīvības iela is divided into three parts:

Brīvības bulvāris (boulevard) is the traditional name of the part from its beginning at the Freedom Monument to Elizabetes iela (572 m);
Brīvības iela from Elizabetes iela to Gaisa tilts bridge (3049 m);
Brīvības gatve from Gaisa tilts bridge to the city border (8450 m).

Notable buildings

Brīvības bulvāris

Brīvības iela

 Richard Wagner lived in 1838 - 1839 in a house at the intersection of Brīvības iela and Dzirnavu iela (Mühlenstraße). The house was destroyed but its location is now marked with a memorial plaque.
 Number 34 - Building of the Riga Regional Court designed by Jānis Frīdrihs Baumanis (1888)
 Number 75 - Dailes Theatre, formerly State Academic Theatre of the Latvian SSR; 1976

Brīvības gatve

External links

Streets in Riga